Nominally, a Statute of Autonomy is a law hierarchically located under the constitution of a country and, usually, over any other form of legislation. This legislative corpus concedes autonomy (self-government) to a subnational unit, and the articles usually mimic the form of a constitution, establishing the organization of the autonomous government, the electoral rules, the distribution of competences between different levels of governance and other regional-specific provisions, like the protection of cultural or lingual realities.

In Spain, the process of devolution after the transition to democracy (1979) created 17 autonomous communities and 2 autonomous cities, each having its own Statute of Autonomy. On 18 June 2006, Catalonia approved by referendum a new but controversial Catalan Statute of Autonomy, enhancing the Spanish territory's degree of autonomy. The original such statute was granted by the Spanish Republic in 1932.

See also
 Autonomous communities of Spain
 Government of Wales Act 1998
 Nationalities and regions of Spain
 Northern Ireland Act 1998
 Scotland Act 1998

References